José Gonzalvo Falcón (16 January 1920 – 31 May 1978), sometimes referred to as Gonzalvo II or – especially as of late – by the Catalan rendition of his given name Josep Gonzalvo, was a Spanish Catalan footballer and manager. Gonzalvo played for, among others, FC Barcelona, Spain and the Catalan XI.

After retiring as a player, he became a coach and briefly managed Barcelona. He died in 1978 after an unsuccessful operation.

Playing career
Born in Mollet del Vallès, Barcelona, Catalonia, Gonzalvo played for Segunda División team SD Ceuta while doing his military service. He then joined CE Sabadell FC, playing alongside his older brother Juli. He made his La Liga debut with CD Sabadell on 26 September 1943 in a 5-2 defeat to Sevilla CF. After just one season he signed for FC Barcelona. During six seasons with the club he played 198 games and scored 5 goals games in all competitions. Together with a team that included, among others Antoni Ramallets, Velasco, Josep Escolà, Joan Segarra,  Estanislao Basora, César, Ladislao Kubala and his younger brother, Marià, he helped Barcelona win three La Liga titles. He finished his playing career with one season at Real Zaragoza.

International career
Between 1948 and 1950 Gonzalvo also played 8 times for Spain. He made his debut for Spain in a 2-1 win  against Ireland on 5 May 1948 and, together with Marià, went on to represent them at the 1950 World Cup. Between 1942 and 1950  he also played five times for the Catalan XI. His first game was 6-2 defeat against CF Barcelona on 5 July 1942 at  Les Corts.

Managerial career
In January 1963 Gonzalvo succeeded Ladislao Kubala as manager of FC Barcelona, but only took charge of the club for fifteen La Liga games. During his brief spell as manager, he did however guide a team that included Joan Segarra, Jesús Garay, Chus Pereda, Sándor Kocsis and Ferran Olivella to a Copa del Generalísimo win. In the final they beat Real Zaragoza 3-1.

Personal life
His two brothers were also notable footballers. Juli Gonzalvo, known as Gonzalvo I played for RCD Espanyol while Marià Gonzalvo, known as Gonzalvo III, also played for Barcelona and Spain.

His two sons, Josep Maria Gonzalvo and Jordi Gonzalvo were also managers.

Honours

Player
Barcelona
La Liga: 1945, 1948, 1949
Latin Cup: 1949
Supercopa de España: 1945, 1949

Manager
Barcelona
Copa del Generalísimo: 1963

References

External links
 Spain stats
Bio at www.fcbarcelonaonline.com
Josep Gonzalvo at www.fcbarcelona.com 

1920 births
1978 deaths
Footballers from Catalonia
Spanish footballers
Spain international footballers
La Liga players
FC Barcelona players
Real Zaragoza players
CE Sabadell FC footballers
1950 FIFA World Cup players
FC Barcelona managers
Spanish football managers
La Liga managers
Association football defenders
People from Vallès Occidental
Sportspeople from the Province of Barcelona
Catalonia international footballers
Josep
Association football midfielders